{{Infobox horseraces
|class      = Group 3
|horse race = Princess Royal Stakes
|image      = 
|caption    = 
|location   = Rowley MileNewmarket, England
|inaugurated = 
|race type  = Flat / Thoroughbred
|sponsor    = 
|website    = Newmarket
|distance   = 1m 4f (2,414 metres)
|surface    = Turf
|track      = Right-hand "L"
|qualification = Three-years-old and upfillies and mares
|weight     = 8 st 10 lb (3yo);9 st 3 lb (4yo+)<small>Penalties7 lb for Group 2 winners *5 lb for Group 2 winners *3 lb for Group 3 winners** since 31 March</small>
|purse      = £50,000 (2021)1st: £78,696
|bonuses    = 
}}

|}

The Princess Royal Stakes is a Group 3 flat horse race in Great Britain open to fillies and mares aged three years or older. It is run over a distance of 1 mile and 4 furlongs (2,414 metres) on the Rowley Mile at Newmarket in September.

The title Princess Royal Stakes was originally given to a Group 3 race of similar conditions and distance run at Ascot Racecourse. This race was retitled the Pride Stakes and transferred to Newmarket in 2008, while Ascot's Harvest Stakes, a Listed race, was renamed as the "new" Princess Royal Stakes. The Pride Stakes subsequently returned to Ascot and became the British Champions Fillies' and Mares' Stakes, while the Princess Royal Stakes was moved to Newmarket. It was upgraded to Group 3 status in 2017.

Winners

 See also 
 Horse racing in Great Britain
 List of British flat horse races

 References 
Notes

Sources
Racing Post: 
 ifhaonline.org – International Federation of Horseracing Authorities – Princess Royal Stakes (2019).''

Long-distance horse races for fillies and mares
Newmarket Racecourse
Flat races in Great Britain